The 17th Infantry Division (17-ya Pekhotnaya Diviziya) was an infantry formation of the Russian Imperial Army.

Organization
1st Brigade
65th Infantry Regiment
66th Infantry Regiment
2nd Brigade
67th Infantry Regiment
68th Infantry Regiment
17th Artillery Brigade

Commanders
March 1915-April 1917: Pyotr Telezhnikov

References

Infantry divisions of the Russian Empire
Military units and formations disestablished in 1918